*Naudiz  is the reconstructed Proto-Germanic name of the n-rune , meaning "need, distress". The corresponding Gothic letter is 𐌽 n, named nauþs. The valkyrie Sigrdrífa in Sigrdrífumál talks (to Sigurd) about the rune as a beer-rune and that 
"You should learn beer-runes
if you don’t want another man’s wife
to abuse your trust if you have a tryst.
Carve them on the drinking-horn
and on the back of your hand,
and carve the rune ᚾ on your fingernail."

The rune is recorded in all three rune poems:

See also
Elder Futhark
Younger Futhark
Rune poem

References 

Runes